Richard Ofori may refer to:

 Richard Ofori (defender) (born 1993), Ghanaian football defender for Nea Salamina Famagusta
 Richard Ofori (goalkeeper) (born 1993), Ghanaian football goalkeeper for Orlando Pirates